This is an incomplete list of Chernobyl-related charities and charitable organisations that were created in response to the Chernobyl disaster of 1986, or whose work involves supporting those suffering the ongoing effects:

United Kingdom's
 Chernobyl Children's Project (UK)
 Friends of Chernobyl's Children 
 Aid Convoy
 Chernobyl Children Life Line
Chernobyl 2000

Ireland
The Greater Chernobyl Cause
Chernobyl Children's Trust 
 Chernobyl Children International

United States
 Chernobyl Children International

See also
List of Chernobyl-related articles

References

Foreign charities operating in Ukraine
Charities
charities